Sawdust is a neighborhood (formerly a separate unincorporated community) in the city of Harlem, Columbia County, Georgia, United States.

History
Sawdust was so named on account of there being several sawmills near the original town site. The name sometimes is spelled out as "Saw Dust". A post office called Saw Dust was established in 1852, and remained in operation until 1895.

References

Neighborhoods in Georgia (U.S. state)
Harlem, Georgia